The Commercial Crew Program (CCP) provides commercially-operated crew transportation service to and from the International Space Station (ISS) under contract to NASA, conducting crew rotations between the expeditions of the International Space Station program. American space manufacturer SpaceX began providing service in 2020, using the Crew Dragon spacecraft, and NASA plans to add Boeing when its Boeing Starliner spacecraft becomes operational no earlier than 2024. NASA has contracted for six operational missions from Boeing and fourteen from SpaceX, ensuring sufficient support for ISS through 2030.

The spacecraft are owned and operated by the vendor, and crew transportation is provided to NASA as a commercial service. Each mission sends up to four astronauts to the ISS, with an option for a fifth passenger available. Operational flights occur approximately once every six months for missions that last for approximately six months. A spacecraft remains docked to the ISS during its mission, and missions usually overlap by at least a few days. Between the retirement of the Space Shuttle in 2011 and the first operational CCP mission in 2020, NASA relied on the Soyuz program to transport its astronauts to the ISS.

A Crew Dragon spacecraft is launched to space atop a Falcon 9 Block 5 launch vehicle and the capsule returns to Earth via splashdown in the ocean near Florida. The program's first operational mission, SpaceX Crew-1, launched on 16 November 2020. Boeing Starliner spacecraft will participate after its final test flight, launched atop an Atlas V N22 launch vehicle. Instead of a splashdown, a Starliner capsule will return on land with airbags at one of four designated sites in the western United States.

Development of the Commercial Crew Program began in 2011 as NASA shifted from internal development of crewed vehicles to perform ISS crew rotation to commercial industry development of transport to the ISS. A series of open competitions over the following two years saw successful bids from Boeing, Blue Origin, Sierra Nevada, and SpaceX to develop proposals for ISS crew transport vehicles. In 2014, NASA awarded separate fixed-price contracts to Boeing and SpaceX to develop their respective systems and to fly astronauts to the ISS. Each contract required four successful demonstrations to achieve human rating for the system: pad abort, uncrewed orbital test, launch abort, and crewed orbital test. Operational missions were initially planned to begin in 2017, with missions alternating between the two providers. Delays required NASA to purchase additional seats on Soyuz spacecraft up to Soyuz MS-17 until Crew Dragon missions commenced in 2020. Crew Dragon continues to handle all missions until Starliner becomes operational in 2024.

Background 
In 2004, the Aldridge Commission – established by President George W. Bush following the Space Shuttle Columbia disaster – called for crewed flights to the Moon with a Crew Exploration Vehicle in its final report. Following the NASA Authorization Act of 2005, the Constellation program was established, which envisioned a revised Crew Exploration Vehicle named Orion conducting crew rotation flights to the International Space Station (ISS) in addition to its lunar exploration goals. Orion superseded the Orbital Space Plane, which was specifically designed for ISS crew rotation. In 2009, the Augustine Commission appointed by President Barack Obama found that the program's funding and resources were insufficient to execute its goals without significant delays to its schedule and an increase of US$3 billion in funding, which prompted NASA to start considering alternatives to the program. The Constellation program was officially cancelled in 2010, with NASA repurposing Orion for exploration beyond Earth, and collaborating with commercial partners for ISS crew rotation and other crewed activities in low Earth orbit following the retirement of the Space Shuttle program in 2011. This arrangement would additionally end NASA's dependency on Roscosmos' Soyuz program to deliver its astronauts to the ISS.

Development

CCDev awards 

The NASA Authorization Act of 2010 allocated US$1.3 billion for an expansion of the existing Commercial Crew Development (CCDev) program over three years. While the program's first round of competition in 2010 focused on funding development of various human spaceflight technologies in the private sector as part of the American Recovery and Reinvestment Act, its second round, CCDev 2, focused on proposals for spacecraft capable of shuttling astronauts to and from the ISS. The competition for CCDev 2 funding concluded in April 2011, with Blue Origin receiving US$22 million to develop its biconic nose cone capsule concept, SpaceX receiving US$75 million to develop a crewed version of their Dragon spacecraft and a human-rated Falcon 9 launch vehicle, the Sierra Nevada Corporation receiving US$80 million to develop the Dream Chaser, and Boeing receiving US$92.3 million to develop the CST-100 Starliner. SpaceX had previously been contracted by NASA to operate ISS resupply flights with their Dragon spacecraft, as part of NASA's Commercial Resupply Services. The program's third round, Commercial Crew integrated Capability (CCiCap), aimed to financially support the development of winning proposals over 21 months through to May 2014, in preparation for crewed missions to the ISS within five years. Despite winning awards in CCDev 1 and CCDev 2, Blue Origin decided against competing in CCiCap, opting instead to rely on private investment from their owner, Jeff Bezos, to continue development on crewed spaceflight. The competition for CCiCap funding ended in August 2012, with US$212.5 million allocated to Sierra Nevada's Dream Chaser, US$440 million allocated to SpaceX's Crew Dragon, and US$460 million allocated to Boeing's Starliner. While Alliant Techsystems's integrated Liberty launch vehicle and spacecraft was a finalist, it was rejected due to concerns about the lack of detail in Alliant Techsystems's proposal.

In December 2012, the three CCiCap winners were each given an additional USD$10 million in funding as the first of two series of "certification products contracts" (CPC) to allow for further testing, engineering standards, and design analysis to meet NASA's safety requirements for crewed spaceflight. The second CPC series manifested as Commercial Crew Transportation Capability (CCtCap), the final phase of the CCDev program, where NASA would certify an operator to run crewed flights to the ISS through an open competition. The window for proposal submissions was closed on 22 January 2014. Sierra Nevada announced a week later that a privately-funded orbital test flight of a Dream Chaser spacecraft, using an Atlas V launch vehicle intended to be purchased by Sierra Nevada, was planned to occur on 1 November 2016. On 16 September 2014, CCtCap concluded with SpaceX's Crew Dragon and Boeing's Starliner being the sole winners, with SpaceX receiving US$2.6 billion contract and Boeing a US$4.2 billion contract. Sierra Nevada filed a protest with the Government Accountability Office (GAO) in response, citing "serious questions and inconsistencies in the source selection process." The United States Court of Federal Claims upheld a decision to allow development of the Crew Dragon and Starliner to proceed during the protest, citing concerns for crewed operations of the ISS in the event of a delay to the Commercial Crew Program. The GAO declined Sierra Nevada's protest in January 2015, stating that evidence gathered by the GAO discredited Sierra Nevada's claims against NASA; Sierra Nevada accepted the decision. The company laid off 90 staff members working on the Dream Chaser following the CCtCap result, and repurposed the spacecraft as a for-hire vehicle for commercial spaceflight. A cargo variant of the Dream Chaser would later be developed and selected by NASA to fly uncrewed resupply missions to the ISS under a Commercial Resupply Services 2 contract.

Post-selection 

While the first flights of Commercial Crew Program were originally intended to be launched by the end of 2017, Boeing announced in May 2016 that their first crewed flight would be delayed to 2018 due to issues related to Starliner's Atlas V N22 launch vehicle. In December 2016, SpaceX announced their first crewed flights would also be delayed to 2018, following the loss of AMOS-6 in an accidental launch pad explosion of a Falcon 9, the Crew Dragon's launch vehicle. With no further flights in the Soyuz program for American astronauts past 2018, the GAO expressed concerns and recommended in February 2017 that NASA develop a plan for crew rotation in the event of further delays. Following the settlement of a lawsuit against Russian space manufacturer Energia over Sea Launch, Boeing received options for up to five seats on Soyuz flights, which NASA purchased from Boeing. NASA announced the astronauts chosen to pilot the Crew Dragon and Starliner vehicles in August 2018, and two months later penned the launch of demonstration missions for the Crew Dragon and Starliner for dates in 2019. The uncrewed SpaceX Demo-1 mission was launched on 2 March 2019, in which a Crew Dragon successfully docked with the ISS and returned to Earth six days after launch. The capsule used in the mission, however, was accidentally destroyed in a static fire test of its SuperDraco engines in April 2019, causing further delays to launch of future Crew Dragon flights. The Boeing Orbital Flight Test and Boeing Crew Flight Test, which had both been delayed due to a failed test of Starliner's abort system, were further pushed without explanation from dates in early-to-mid 2019 to late 2019.

Boeing conducted the Boeing Pad Abort Test in November 2019. NASA accepted the test as successful even though one of three parachutes failed to deploy, since the system landed as designed under two parachutes. Boeing conducted the Orbital Flight Test in December 2019 and encountered major malfunctions of Starliner's software which precluded an intended docking with the ISS and prompted a truncation of the mission. The Orbital Flight Test was declared a "high-visibility close call" by NASA following an independent review, and a second Orbital Flight Test (Boeing OFT-2) was scheduled for July 2021, with Boeing covering the cost of the flight in lieu of additional CCDev funding. Amid further uncertainties about the Commercial Crew Program's progress, NASA purchased a seat on the Soyuz MS-17 mission to ensure participation in Expedition 64 in the event that operational missions in the program are further delayed, with the purchase of additional Soyuz seats beyond MS-17 being described as a possibility. The SpaceX In-Flight Abort Test was successfully conducted in January 2020, setting the stage for the final, crewed test flight of Crew Dragon – SpaceX Demo-2 – which launched astronauts Bob Behnken and Doug Hurley to the ISS in May 2020. SpaceX launched its first operational flight, SpaceX Crew-1, on 16 November 2020. It stayed docked to the ISS as planned until 2 May 2021. SpaceX Crew-2 launched on 23 April 2021 and it landed on 9 November 2021, two days before the launch of SpaceX Crew-3. When Boeing OFT-2 was on the pad preparing for launch on 3 August 2021, problems were encountered with 13 valves in the capsule's propulsion system. The launch was scrubbed and the capsule eventually returned to the factory. Analysis of the problem was still underway in September 2021 and launch was postponed indefinitely. This uncrewed test, Boeing Orbital Flight Test 2, launched on 19 May 2022, and landed successfully on 25 May.

On February 28, 2022, NASA announced that it had awarded three additional crew missions to SpaceX bringing the total crew missions for SpaceX to nine and the total contract value to $3,490,872,904. In September 2022, NASA announced yet another addition, this time of five missions, bringing the total to fourteen and the total contract value to $4.93 billion.

Spacecraft 
The Commercial Crew Program uses the SpaceX Crew Dragon to shuttle astronauts to and from the ISS.  The Boeing CST-100 Starliner will join it in this role after it is human-rated. Both spacecraft are automated but can be remotely controlled from the ground or manually controlled by their crew via touch screens in case of an emergency. The crew cabins of both spacecraft feature  of pressurized volume, and can be configured to carry up to seven crew each, though NASA will only send up to four crew on each mission in the program; an extension to occupy a fifth seat is available to NASA. Both spacecraft can last up to 210 days in space docked to the ISS. In addition, the spacecraft were designed to meet NASA's safety standard of a 1-in-270 chance of catastrophic failure, which is less risky than the 1-in-90 chance of the Space Shuttle.

The spacecraft and the ISS have docking mechanisms that implement the International Docking System Standard (IDSS). The NASA Docking System implementation is used by Starliner and ISS, while Crew Dragon uses a compatible IDSS implementation developed by SpaceX. The IDSS docks are used instead of the Common Berthing Mechanism used by previous Commercial Orbital Transportation Services spacecraft such as the first-generation Dragon.

Crew Dragon

SpaceX's Crew Dragon is a variant of the company's Dragon 2 class of spacecraft, which is an upgraded version of the first-generation Dragon. While trunks are discarded prior to capsule reentry, crew cabins are designed to be reusable. Alternatively, Crew Dragon spacecraft can be repurposed as uncrewed Cargo Dragon spacecraft for use in SpaceX's Commercial Resupply Services 2 missions, with each capsule capable of being flown up to five times. Crew Dragon spacecraft can spend up to a week in free flight without being docked to the ISS. Each Crew Dragon capsule is equipped with a launch escape system consisting of eight of SpaceX's SuperDraco engines, which provide  of thrust each. These engines were originally intended to also perform a propulsive landing upon return to Earth, with the first test vehicle having been equipped for such capabilities, but these plans were ultimately abandoned in favor of a traditional splashdown return near Florida in either the Atlantic Ocean or the Gulf of Mexico. SpaceX's CCtCap contract values each seat on a Crew Dragon flight to be between US$60–67 million on the first six missions, while the face value of each seat has been estimated by NASA's Office of Inspector General (OIG) to be around US$55 million. Per-mission cost for the first contract extension (missions 7, 8, and 9) is $258.7 million ($64.6 million/seat), and per-mission cost for the second contract extension (missions 10 through 14) is $288 million ($72 million/seat).

Starliner

The crew module of Starliner can be reused for up to ten flights, while the service module is expended during each flight. Various engines manufactured by Aerojet Rocketdyne for orbital maneuvering, attitude control, reaction control, and launch escape, are utilized by Starliner. Eight reaction control engines on the spacecraft's crew module and 28 reaction control engines on the spacecraft's service module provide  and  each, respectively. Also located on the service module, 20 custom-made Orbital Maneuvering and Attitude Control (OMAC) engines provide  of thrust each, while four RS-88 engines provide  of thrust each in a launch abort scenario. During a nominal flight without a launch abort, Starliner can use unspent fuel reserved for its RS-88 engines to help its OMAC engines perform the orbital insertion burn, following separation from the Centaur upper stage during launch. Once in space, Starliner spacecraft can survive up to 60 hours in free flight. Unlike Crew Dragon, Starliner is designed to return to Earth on land instead of ocean, using airbags to cushion the vehicle's impact with the ground. Four sites in the western contiguous United States – the Dugway Proving Ground in Utah, Edwards Air Force Base in California, White Sands Missile Range in New Mexico, and Willcox Playa in Arizona – will serve as landing ranges for returning Starliner spacecraft, though in an emergency scenario, it is also equipped to perform a splashdown return. Boeing's CCtCap contract values each seat on a CST-100 flight to be between US$91–99 million, while the face value of each seat has been estimated by NASA's OIG to be around US$90 million.

Missions 

NASA missions to the ISS launch on an average every six months. As part of the original contracts Boeing and SpaceX each were initially contracted for up to six operational flights.  NASA later contracted with SpaceX for up to an additional eight flights as a contingency if Starliner is further delayed and to ensure service to the ISS until 2030.

Crew Dragon Missions

SpaceX's Crew-1 mission, the first operational flight in the program, carried Victor Glover, Mike Hopkins, Soichi Noguchi, and Shannon Walker to the ISS in November 2020 aboard Resilience. Resilience was originally planned to be used for Crew-2, but was reassigned following a scheduling change resulting from the accidental destruction of C204 during testing. While NASA astronauts were given assignments to either Crew Dragon or Starliner flights, Noguchi – a JAXA astronaut – was open for assignment to whichever spacecraft would launch the first operational mission. With Chris Cassidy having arrived at the ISS during Soyuz MS-16, the arrival of the astronauts aboard Resilience marked the first time since the Space Shuttle program in which the US Orbital Segment of the ISS was completely staffed with four crew. Crew-2 launched in April 2021, using a previously-flown Falcon 9 first-stage booster and a refurbished Crew Dragon for the first time. The mission carried Shane Kimbrough, Megan McArthur, Akihiko Hoshide and Thomas Pesquet aboard Endeavour. Crew-3 launched in November 2021, carrying Thomas Marshburn, Raja Chari, Matthias Maurer and Kayla Barron to the ISS, and Crew-4 launched Kjell Lindgren, Bob Hines, Samantha Cristoforetti and Jessica Watkins in April 2022. US astronauts Josh Cassada, Nicole Aunapu Mann and JAXA astronaut Koichi Wakata initially assigned to Starliner crewed flights were re-assigned to Crew-5 mission after delays in the Starliner program. The fourth astronaut on Crew-5 is filled by a Russian cosmonaut Anna Kikina and thus becoming to be a part of the Soyuz-Dragon crew swap system, that is, keeping at least one NASA astronaut and one Roscosmos cosmonaut on each of the crew rotation missions. That would ensure both countries would have a presence on the station, and ability to maintain their separate systems, if either Soyuz or commercial crew vehicles are grounded for an extended period.

On 3 December 2021, NASA made clear it would secure up to an additional three flights from SpaceX to maintain an uninterrupted U.S. capability for human access to the space station. The background to this was that SpaceX was likely to launch its sixth flight in early 2023 potentially before Boeing's first operational flight, and NASA concluded that only SpaceX had the capability needed.

NASA and Roscosmos have agreed to an annual seat-swapping agreement for three flights each. In 2022, 2023, and 2024, a Russian cosmonaut will fly on one Crew Dragon flight per year  while an American astronaut will fly on one Soyuz flight per year. This arrangement ensures that ISS will have at least one crew member to operate essential services even if one or the other type of spacecraft is grounded.

On 31 August 2022, NASA awarded SpaceX with an additional 5 flights bringing the total number of contracted Crew Dragon flights to 14.  The additional flights will run though 2030.

Boeing Starliner Missions
Boeing's first operational mission in the program, Starliner-1, was planned to ferry astronauts Sunita Williams and Jeanette Epps to the ISS in 2022 aboard Calypso. On 18 April 2022, NASA said that it has not finalized which of the cadre of Starliner astronauts, including Barry Wilmore, Michael Fincke, and Sunita Williams, will actually fly on the CFT mission or the first operational Starliner mission. NASA astronaut Jeanette Epps continues to prepare for an upcoming long duration mission aboard Starliner-1. NASA has also identified backup flight opportunities for Epps on the SpaceX Crew Dragon for additional scheduling and resource flexibility. Epps has begun cross-training on the Crew Dragon to prepare for this.

NASA hopes to extend the seat-swapping arrangement with Roscosmos to include Starliner flights after Starliner has enough flights.

Operational CCP missions

Timeline
The CCP spacecraft missions usually overlap with brief intervals during which two are docked at the same time. Crew-2 did not overlap with Crew-3 because of an unexpected delay in Crew-3 launch.
 ||28}}  
Define $endofmonth =/$lastday/  
Define $now =//
ImageSize = width:1000 height:auto barincrement:40
PlotArea  = top:10 bottom:40 right:160 left:0
AlignBars = late
DateFormat = mm/dd/yyyy
Period     = from:11/01/2020 till:$endofmonth
TimeAxis   = orientation:horizontal
ScaleMajor  = unit:year increment:1 start:01/01/2021
ScaleMinor  = unit:month increment:1 start:11/01/2020

Colors =
  id:bg           value:white
  id:docked       value:rgb(0.894,0.882,0.871) 
  id:undocked     value:limegreen
  id:Crew_Dragon  value:skyblue legend: Crew_Dragon 
  id:Starliner    value:coral   legend: Starliner   

Legend = columns:2 left:150 top:25 columnwidth:100

PlotData=
 width:18 align:center fontsize:12 shift:(0,-5)

 bar:Q4
   from:11/17/2020 till:05/02/2021 color:Crew_Dragon text:Crew-1
   from:11/11/2021 till:05/05/2022 color:Crew_Dragon text:Crew-3
   from:10/06/2022 till:03/11/2023 color:Crew_Dragon text:Crew-5
 bar:Q2 
   from:04/24/2021 till:11/08/2021 color:Crew_Dragon text:Crew-2
   from:04/27/2022 till:10/14/2022 color:Crew_Dragon text:Crew-4
   from:03/02/2023 till:$now color:Crew_Dragon text:Crew-6

LineData=

 layer:front
 at:11/17/2020 width:0.1 color:docked
 at:05/02/2021 width:0.1 color:undocked
 at:04/24/2021 width:0.1 color:docked
 at:11/08/2021 width:0.1 color:undocked
 at:11/11/2021 width:0.1 color:docked
 at:05/05/2022 width:0.1 color:undocked
 at:04/27/2022 width:0.1 color:docked
 at:10/14/2022 width:0.1 color:undocked
 at:10/06/2022 width:0.1 color:docked
 at:03/11/2023 width:0.1 color:undocked
 at:03/02/2023 width:0.1 color:docked

}}

See also 

 Artemis program
 List of Falcon 9 and Falcon Heavy launches
 List of human spaceflights to the International Space Station
 List of Atlas launches (2020–2029)

References 

Sources

 
 
 

Citations

Notes

External links 

 Commercial Crew Program at NASA (Archived 1 March 2019, 25 May 2020)
 CCtCap contract between Boeing and NASA
 CCtCap contract between SpaceX and NASA

2010s in spaceflight
2020s in spaceflight
Human spaceflight programs
International Space Station
NASA programs
Projects established in 2011
Private spaceflight